Goldbach may refer to:

Rivers
Germany:
Goldbach (Bode), a large stream in the Harz Mountains
Goldbach (Tollense), a river of Mecklenburg-Vorpommern
Goldbach (Este), a river of Lower Saxony, tributary of the Este
Goldbach (Möhne), a river of North Rhine-Westphalia, tributary of the Möhne 
Goldbach (Eder), a river of Hesse, tributary of the Eder
Goldbach (Ems), a river of Hesse, tributary of the Ems
Goldbach (Münzbach), a river of Saxony, tributary of the Münzbach
Goldbach (Bibers), a river of Baden-Württemberg, tributary of the Bibers
Goldbach (Aschaff), a river of Bavaria, tributary of the Aschaff
Goldbach (Kahl), a river of Bavaria, tributary of the Kahl
Goldbach (Mangfall), a river of Bavaria, tributary of the Mangfall
Goldbach (Pegnitz), a river of Bavaria, tributary of the Pegnitz
Switzerland:

Places
Germany:
Goldbach, Bavaria, a municipality in Bavaria
Goldbach, Thuringia, a municipality in Thuringia
Goldbach, a quarter of Crailsheim in Baden-Württemberg
France:
Goldbach-Altenbach, a commune in the Haut-Rhin department in Alsace-Champagne-Ardenne-Lorraine
Switzerland:
Goldbach, part of Hasle bei Burgdorf, canton of Berne
Goldbach, part of Lützelflüh, canton of Berne
Goldbach, Zurich, part of Küsnacht ZH, canton of Zurich

People
Christian Goldbach, an 18th-century Prussian mathematician
Sandra Goldbach, a German rower

Mathematics
Goldbach's conjecture, one of the oldest unsolved problems in number theory
Goldbach's weak conjecture, also known as the odd Goldbach conjecture, the ternary Goldbach problem, or the 3-primes problem
Goldbach's comet, a plot of the so-called Goldbach function
Goldbach–Euler theorem, also known as Goldbach's theorem